Rena Scott (born 1956) is an American soul and R&B artist, from Detroit.

Biography
Rena Scott was recognized as a child for her singing ability in church. She performed her first talent show at the age of 13, and afterwards her first record "I Just Can't Forget That Boy", was released. She performed during that period as an opening act at local venues for many of the Motown acts like The Temptations, the Four Tops, and The Originals. The highlight of that period was singing back-up for Aretha Franklin at Carnegie Hall.

Her biggest hit came in 1978 with "Take Me I'm Yours", a duet with Michael Henderson. After touring with Henderson on the strength of this, Michael's record company Buddha Records signed her to a record deal and she recorded her first full-length album, Come on Inside, in 1979.  The album's only single release – "Super Lover" peaked at #92 in July 1979 on the Billboard R&B Singles Charts. The album was produced by the R&B team Mtume and Reggie Lucas, former jazz musicians who had scored pop hits for Stephanie Mills, Roberta Flack, Donnie Hathaway, Phyllis Hyman and Lou Rawls.

Scott toured nightclubs in Detroit and later Los Angeles, and then to crowds of up to 50,000 people in R&B and Jazz festivals in the U.S. and Europe, such as the Montrose Jazz festival in Montrose, Switzerland. She toured with The Crusaders, sharing the stage with George Benson and Natalie Cole. She came on board with founding Crusaders members Joe Sample, Wilton Felder and Stix Hooper after the departure of Randy Crawford, performing renditions of their 1979 pop hit "Street Life".

After Buddah Records folded, she left Detroit for Las Vegas, where she did shows at Caesar's Palace and the Landmark Hotel before settling in Los Angeles to seek new recording opportunities. Before hooking up with The Crusaders, she had started writing songs with Producer and songwriter Skip Scarborough who wrote songs for LTD, Anita Baker and Earth, Wind & Fire. In 1987, Scott re-emerged on Sedona Records with Love Zone, whose first single "Do That To Me One More Time" made the Billboard Hot Black Singles chart.

Scott's latest "Can't Wait" was released on her own record label, Amor Records. Songs from Rena's CD/DVD Let Me Love You were featured in the film Love and Action in Chicago, which was shown on the HBO, Showtime, Cinemax, Starz and BET cable television networks. It starred Regina King, Courtney Vance, Kathleen Turner, and Ed Asner. She charted in three categories on the Billboard charts with a song from the same set titled "Remember" for 18 weeks. It peaked at #9 in the Hot Pop Singles Sales; #5 in the Hot R&B/Hip-Hop Single Sales; and #80 in the top 100 R&B/Hip-Hop Songs. Another song from the set, "A Love Thang", reached #1 on the Hot R&B/Hip-Hop Single Sales chart and #17 on the Hot Pop Single Sales.

Discography
Come On Inside (1979)
Love Zone (1987)
Let Me Love You (2004)
Take Me Away (2010)

References

External links
 Official website.

1956 births
American dance musicians
American women singers
American rhythm and blues singers
Buddah Records artists
Singers from Detroit
Living people
21st-century American women